Karnataka Knowledge Commission (Karnataka Jńana Aayoga} is a commission constituted in September 2008 under the Chairmanship of Dr. K. Kasturirangan by B. S. Yeddyurappa, the former Chief Minister of Karnataka with an overarching aim of "transforming Karnataka into a vibrant knowledge society".

The Karnataka Knowledge Commission (KKC), an important constituent of the Government of Karnataka, came into existence in the year 2008. It is headed by Dr. K. Kasturirangan, Member of Planning Commission, Government of India and a former member of Rajya Sabha. The members of the Commission are drawn from diverse fields like education, science and technology, agriculture and industry.

The Commission is independent of the Government and works with and for the Government in policy making and implementation.

Organisation

The Karnataka Jnana Aayoga consists of 11 members by name, including a Chairman and a Member-secretary cum Executive Director, as well as 17 ex officio members drawn from National Institutes, Universities and various government departments. The Commission consists of 28 members in all. The Commission currently has six focus areas, and each focus area has a Working Group composed of experts in that specific field. A Working Groups can form a smaller sub-group of experts called the Study Group and can consult stakeholders and experts other than members for their views and opinions.

The office of Karnataka Knowledge is Located at Vidhana Soudha, Bangalore.

See also 
Nava Karnataka 2025

References 

https://web.archive.org/web/20110722214814/http://www.prajavani.net/web/include/story.php?news=14895&section=44&menuid=10

http://www.business-standard.com/india/news/state-accepts-5-advicesknowledge-commission/408960/

http://articles.timesofindia.indiatimes.com/2008-09-02/bangalore/27933641_1_higher-education-k-kasturirangan-karnataka-knowledge-commission

https://web.archive.org/web/20110726135925/http://www.knowledgecommission.gov.in/downloads/news/news323.pdf
https://web.archive.org/web/20110322180557/http://www.knowledgecommission.gov.in/
http://www.nif.org.in/

External links 

 http://www.karnataka.gov.in/jnanaayoga/Pages/home.aspx
 https://web.archive.org/web/20090107093324/http://karunadu.gov.in/
 http://kanaja.in/
 https://web.archive.org/web/20110322180557/http://www.knowledgecommission.gov.in/
 http://www.deccanherald.com/content/35458/knowledge-commission-wants-hike-higher.html
 http://www.dnaindia.com/academy/report_e-books-may-reach-karnataka-govt-schools_1497207
 http://news.webindia123.com/news/articles/India/20100924/1594055.html
 http://www.jainuniversity.ac.in/Research_ResCen_Act8.htm
 http://www.dnaindia.com/bangalore/report_permanent-secretary-for-knowledge-commission-soon_1197788

Think tanks based in India
Organizations established in 2008